Juventude Desportiva do Lis, better known as Juve Lis, is a Portuguese handball from Leiria established in 1985. It is best known for its women's team, which made its international debut in 2003, in the Cup Winners' Cup. It subsequently made five appearances in the Challenge Cup between 2004 and 2012. In 2013 it will make its debut in the EHF Cup.

References

Sport in Leiria
Portuguese handball clubs
1985 establishments in Portugal